The following is a partial list of scientific journals. There are thousands of scientific journals in publication, and many more have been published at various points in the past. The list given here is far from exhaustive, only containing some of the most influential, currently publishing journals in each field. As a rule of thumb, each field should be represented by fewer than ten positions, chosen by their impact factors and other ratings.

Note: there are many science magazines that are not scientific journals, including Scientific American, New Scientist, Australasian Science and others. They are not listed here.

For periodicals in the social sciences and humanities, see list of social science journals.

General and multidisciplinary science

Basic and physical sciences

Archaeology

Astronomy and astrophysics

Chemistry

Earth and atmospheric sciences

Materials science

Mechanics
 Annual Review of Fluid Mechanics
 Archive for Rational Mechanics and Analysis

Physics

Life sciences

Biology in general

Agriculture

Bioinformatics
See List of bioinformatics journals

Biophysics and biochemistry

Botany

Chronobiology
 Chronobiology International

Development

Ecology

Forestry

Genetics

Husbandry
 Rangifer

Immunology

Neuroscience

Veterinary medicine

Zoology

Engineering

Environmental engineering

Mechanical engineering

Computer science

Robotics and automation

Mathematics

General mathematics

Statistics

Medicine and health care

Public health

Nursing

Nutrition and food science

Psychiatry

Other fields

Energy

Forensic science

Physical education
 African Journal for Physical, Health Education, Recreation and Dance

Social science

See also
 List of academic databases and search engines
 List of academic journals
 List of science magazines of popular and non peer-reviewed kind
 List of open access journals

Scientific
Lists of publications in science